Sound is an audible mechanical wave propagating through matter, or the perception of such waves by the brain.

Sound or Sounds may also refer to:

Geography

 Sound (geography), a large ocean inlet, or a narrow ocean channel between two bodies of land
 Sound, Cheshire
 Sound, Lerwick in Shetland
 Sound Heath, an area of common land in Sound, Cheshire
 Milford Sound, a fjord in the South Island of New Zealand
 Øresund or Öresund, commonly known in English as the Sound, is a strait which forms the Danish–Swedish border, separating Zealand (Denmark) from Scania (Sweden).

Arts, entertainment, and media

Literature
 "Sounds" (short story), a short story by Vladimir Nabokov
 Klänge (English translation: Sounds), a 1912 book by Russian expressionist artist Wassily Kandinsky

Music

Groups
 Sound (band), a Filipino jazz band (formed 1999)
 The Sound (band), a defunct English post-punk band (from 1979 to 1988)
 The Sounds, a Swedish indie-rock band (formed 1999)

Albums
 Sound (Dreadzone album), a 2001 studio album by the British fusion band Dreadzone
 Sound (Roscoe Mitchell album), a 1966 studio album by the American jazz saxophonist Roscoe Mitchell
 Sounds!, a 1966 album by guitarist Jack Marshall and percussionist Shelly Manne
Sounds (Spare Snare album), a 2018 album by Scottish lofi band Spare Snare

Genres
 Sound (cumbia), a Chilean musical genre similar to tecnocumbia
 Sound, a music subgenre or "scene", such as the Nashville sound

Other uses in music
 "Sound" (song), a 1991 single by the English rock band James
 Soundtrack, the recorded sound accompanying a visual medium such as a motion picture, television show, or video game

Television 

 Sound (TV series), a BBC programme featuring current popular music of different genres, aired between 2007 and 2009
 Sounds (TV series), an Australian music television series of the 1970s and 1980s

Other uses in arts, entertainment, and media
 Sounds (magazine), a defunct British music weekly newspaper, published between 1970 and 1991
 Soundwave (Transformers), one of the Decepticons in The Transformers universe

Sports 
 Austin Sound, an American women's gridiron football team
 Memphis Sounds, a defunct basketball team of the American Basketball Association
 Nashville Sounds, a Minor League Baseball team in the International League of Triple-A

Other uses
 Sound (medical instrument), an instrument for probing and dilating passages within the body
 Sound (nautical), a verb meaning to take depth readings of fluids in a tank or around a ship
 Sound (sex toy), a sex toy designed to be inserted through the urethra of the penis for sexual pleasure
 Sound, the act of diving by a whale
 Soundness, a logical term meaning that an argument is valid and its premises are true
 Speech sound or phone, a speech segment analyzed below the phonemic level

See also
 Soundz (born 1989), American musician
 Audio (disambiguation)
 Soundwave (disambiguation)
 The Sound (disambiguation)